Heiko Bonath is a former handballer from East Germany, who played for the club SC Dynamo Berlin. He won the bronze medal at the world championships in 1986.
.

References 

East German male handball players
Living people
Year of birth missing (living people)